Ciliella is a genus of gastropods belonging to the family Hygromiidae.

The species of this genus are found in Southern Europe.

Species:

Ciliella beccarii 
Ciliella ciliata

References

Hygromiidae